Sutton Junction railway station was a station in Sutton-in-Ashfield, Nottinghamshire, England. It was opened in 1850, and was located on the Midland Railway's Mansfield Branch Line (Now the Robin Hood Line). It was one of four stations that served the town. The others were Sutton-in-Ashfield Central, Sutton-in-Ashfield and Sutton-in-Ashfield Town. The station was replaced by the modern-day station on the same line and now known as "Sutton Parkway".

History
Opened by the Midland Railway, it became part of the London, Midland and Scottish Railway during the Grouping of 1923. The station then passed on to the London Midland Region of British Railways on nationalisation in 1948, the station survived use until 1964.

Stationmasters
From 1907 the station master's position was taken over by the stationmaster at Sutton-in-Ashfield
W. Clay ca. 1860 - 1881
William Tomblin 1881 - 1886 
Charles Snell 1886 - 1894 (afterwards station master at Sutton-in-Ashfield)
Louis Elvidge 1894 - 1907

The site today

The Robin Hood Line was revived in the 1990s following the closure of the Mansfield Railway through the town and the freight-only route was then reused. However, the new station was opened 700m east from the former station site. Nothing remains of the station site. Only the lines are still in use.

References

 
 
 Station on navigable O.S. map

Disused railway stations in Nottinghamshire
Former Midland Railway stations
Railway stations in Great Britain opened in 1874
Railway stations in Great Britain closed in 1964
Beeching closures in England
Sutton-in-Ashfield